Summer Heights High is an Australian mockumentary television sitcom written by and starring Chris Lilley. Set in the fictional Summer Heights High School in an outer suburb of Sydney (based on Summer Hill), it revolves around high school experiences from the viewpoints of three individuals: "Director of Performing Arts" Mr G; private-school exchange student Ja'mie King; and disobedient, vulgar Tongan-Australian student Jonah Takalua. The series lampoons Australian high-school life and many aspects of the human condition and is filmed as a documentary with non-actors playing supporting characters. As he did in a previous series, We Can Be Heroes: Finding The Australian of the Year, Lilley plays multiple characters, including the aforementioned Mr G, Ja'mie and Jonah. The series premiered on 5 September 2007 at 9:30 pm on ABC TV and ended on 24 October 2007, only lasting eight episodes.

Summer Heights High was a massive ratings success for the Australian Broadcasting Corporation, and was met with mostly positive critical reaction. In 2008, the series won a Logie Award for Most Popular Light Entertainment/Comedy Program. On 26 March 2008, it was announced that the show had been sold for international distribution to BBC Three in the United Kingdom, HBO in the United States, and The Comedy Network in Canada. Following the success of Summer Heights High, Lilley has developed two spin-off shows: Ja'mie: Private School Girl (2013) and Jonah from Tonga (2014).

Format
According to the prologue, a production and filming team travelled to an Australian public high school and followed the daily life of the students and staff for one term. The team would film a documentary from the opinions of the students and staff, especially the three main characters: Ja'mie King, a mean girl-type perfectionist exchanged from a private school; Mr G, a drama teacher with an inflated sense of his talent; and Jonah Takalua, a stereotypical Tongan delinquent, all played by the series' writer, Chris Lilley.

The series is filmed in a documentary style, with the supporting cast drawn from the real-life students and staff of the school where the series was filmed. The program explored the facets of a typical Australian public high school such as social problems, bullying, teenage slang, stereotyping, sexism, racism, and homophobia by showcasing three different individuals: the bully; the rich private school girl; and the teacher. The three main characters' storylines never intersect. The school principal, Margaret Murray, appears in all of their stories.

Cast and characters 

The series focuses on three primary characters, all portrayed by Chris Lilley, at Summer Heights High:

 Ja'mie King, a private-school exchange student who immediately makes friends with the four most popular girls in Year 11. She badmouths her new friends behind their backs, and plans an extravagant school formal. Ja'mie is manipulative, snobbish, unkind, and exhibits a racist attitude towards Asian students.
 Jonah Takalua, a 13-year-old schoolboy of Tongan descent in Year 8. Having previously been expelled from two other schools, Jonah exhibits behavioral issues and is continually in conflict with classmates and teachers that places him at serious risk of expulsion. Jonah also has learning difficulties and attends a remedial English class at "Gumnut Cottage".
 Mr G, an egomaniacal 37-year-old drama teacher who believes that he is an incredibly talented, well-liked teacher whose students share his intense passion for drama and performance; his narcissism places him in constant conflict with other staff members and the school's principal. Mr G is directing his latest school musical, which is based on the death of a student at the school who overdosed on ecstasy. The character has previously been featured on the Seven Network sketch series Big Bite.

There are also a number of supporting characters:
 Margaret Murray (Elida Brereton), the principal of Summer Heights High. Brereton was a real-life principal at Camberwell High School.
 Rodney Parsons (Stan Roach), a science teacher at the school who is also Mr G's officemate and close friend.
 Doug Peterson (David Lennie), the student welfare officer who is determined to help Jonah and keep him from getting expelled; he also runs the "Polynesian Pathways" course.
 Ms Wheatley (Kristy Barnes Cullen), Jonah's language teacher who is constantly aggravated by Jonah and his friends.
 Ms Palmer (Maude Davey), teaches students with reading difficulties at Gumnut Cottage which both Jonah and Leon attend; she is Jonah's favourite teacher.
 Leon Pullami (Asolima Tauati), Jonah's best friend and partner in crime.
 Holly (Jessica Featherby), Bec (Nicole Joy Tan), Jess (Kristie Coade), and Kaitlyn (Alicia Banit) are the popular girls in Year 11 who Ja'mie befriends.
 Ashley, a less-popular Year 11 girl who Ja'mie harasses and calls "fugly" on numerous occasions.
 Candice Coxmurray (Kelly Dingledei), the star of Mr G's musical.
 Keiran McKenna (Ashley McLerie), Jonah's nemesis who is a Year 7 student and very talented breakdancer.
 Toby (Danny Alsabbagh), a Year 10 boy who has Down syndrome. He is originally Mr G's backstage assistant, but then plays the character of Mr G in the musical.
 Rocky Takalua (Tovia Matiasi), Jonah's no-nonsense father, who constantly threatens to send Jonah back to Tonga if he misbehaves.
 Ofa (Ofa Palu), the only girl in Jonah's friendship group.
 Annabel Dickson (Coby Ramsden), the inspiration for Mr G's initial musical. In the series her only appearance is in a photograph, but she's featured in a deleted scene on the DVD release.
Stuart (Vincent Chiang), a student at the school.

Background and production 
Summer Heights High was created and written by Chris Lilley, with all eight episodes directed by Stuart McDonald. Princess Pictures produced the series, with Laura Waters and Bruce Kane serving as executive producers. The series was filmed in Melbourne at Brighton Secondary College,

Episodes

Release

Broadcast 
The series premiered on 5 September 2007 at 9:30 pm on ABC TV and continued for eight weekly episodes until 24 October 2007.  Each episode was also made available for download as a vodcast directly after its screening via the ABC website and iTunes. The third episode was accidentally made available to the ABC website a week early, leading to it also being uploaded to YouTube prior to its television broadcast.

The series was sold overseas, with Lilley embarking on a promotional tour of the United States to promote the U.S. broadcast of the series, which began to air on HBO on 9 November 2008. Lilley had previously declined proposals to remake the series for American audiences. The series also aired on BBC Three in June 2008.

Home media 

Summer Heights High was released on DVD in Australia on 25 October 2007, and was accompanied by a signing appearance by Lilley at an ABC Shop in Melbourne's CBD. It was a new first-day sales record for an ABC release, with 3,475 copies sold. Overall, Summer Heights High is the highest-selling Australian comedy television series on DVD.

Soundtrack 
A soundtrack was released through ABC Shops and the Australian iTunes Store, the latter also containing audio extracts from songs in the series including Mr G's "Bummer Heights High", "Naughty Girl", "She's a Slut" and Jonah's "Being a Poly". Part 2 of the soundtrack of the Summer Heights High album contained songs such as "My Name Is Mr G", "This Time You're Dead" and the Summer Heights High theme. Most of the songs from Part 2 are from the final musical.

"Naughty Girl" was released as a single on 8 March 2008 with remixes by Paul Mac, John Paul Talbot and Stylaz Fuego, peaking at number seven on the Australian ARIA Singles Chart. There was also a new music video clip to go with the song.

Reception

Critical response 
When Summer Heights High aired in Australia, reviewers generally praised Chris Lilley's humour. Writing for TV Tonight, David Knox called the series "a treat" and stated "Lilley is the best comic to emerge from the ABC since Kath & Kim came into their own". The Daily Telegraph published a review calling the series "astonishing work that will be long remembered".

Summer Heights High received generally favourable reviews from American critics; it holds a Metacritic score of 67 out of 100. Robert Lloyd of the Los Angeles Times praised Lilley's performance of Jonah, saying the character "gives the series the heart without which it would otherwise expire". Some critics noted the humour may not translate to American audiences; David Hinckley of the New York Daily News said "while its outrageous characters are often amusing, their palate of jokes runs thin".

Ratings 

The premiere episode of Summer Heights High did well in the ratings as a strong lead-in from the return of The Chaser's War on Everything. It peaked at 1.6 million viewers (5 capital cities) with an average of 1.22 million. Along with Spicks and Specks, Summer Heights High helped ABC TV to achieve its strongest midweek ratings for 2007. The second episode rated stronger than the premiere with an average of 1.375 million viewers tuning in.

The third episode managed to rate very well with 1.275 million viewers while the fourth episode fared well with 1.235 against the season premiere of Prison Break. The fifth episode only managed 1.156 million viewers, the lowest ratings for an episode of the show, although the program remained the highest-rating show in its timeslot. The sixth episode picked up slightly in viewers from the previous week with 1.192 million tuning in. The seventh episode grew in ratings as the penultimate episode, picking up to average 1.307 million viewers for the night. The eighth and final episode achieved the highest ratings for Summer Heights High with a total of 1.512 million viewers watching the concluding episode to the series.

Summer Heights High was the third most-downloaded ABC vodcast in 2007, with 1.2 million downloads in total.

Accolades 
The series was nominated for both Most Outstanding Comedy Program and Most Popular Light Entertainment Program at the Logie Awards of 2008, winning the former. Lilley also won Most Popular Actor, and received nominations for Most Outstanding Actor and the Gold Logie Award for Most Popular Personality on Australian Television for his work on the series. Summer Heights High won the award for Best Television Comedy at the 2008 Australian Film Institute Awards, with Lilley also winning Best Performance in a Television Comedy and the Byron Kennedy Award for outstanding creative enterprise. Stuart McDonald won Best Direction in a TV Comedy Series at the Australian Directors Awards in 2008.

Summer Heights High was nominated for Best Television Theme, as well as Best Music for a Television Series, at the 2008 Screen Music Awards; it lost in both categories to Underbelly. The first episode of Summer Heights High was nominated for the Best Comedy award at the Banff World Television Festival in 2008, losing to Extras.

Controversies 
The series is renowned for its controversial portrayal of such issues as mental disabilities, homosexuality, sexual abuse, and racism. Even before Summer Heights High aired, some community groups complained about a "rape joke" and Mr G's inappropriate "touching" of a boy with Down syndrome.

The Herald Sun reported that parents and some teachers have considered the possibility that the show is influencing children to misbehave at school. Students were reportedly imitating Jonah and Ja'mie, repeating lines that were bullying, racist, and homophobic. Education Union branch president Mary Bluett stated in response that the show was "clearly tongue-in-cheek".

After episode three, in which a character called Annabel dies after taking ecstasy, the family of Annabel Catt, a girl who died taking drugs at the 2007 Good Vibrations Festival in Sydney, complained that the program had been lampooning Annabel's death. ABC apologised to the family, stating that the situation was purely coincidental and assured them that the filming of the episode in question had been completed eleven days before her daughter's death. ABC thereafter began to display a message before each episode stating that there is no link between the series' characters and people in real life. However, despite this, Lilley's fans were begging to bring all the young adolescents and teenagers around Australia and all around the world to educate others not not take drugs e.g. ecstasy as the series also brings a deeper message to the viewers.

A writer for the 2000 Network Ten series Sit Down, Shut Up claimed that Lilley had borrowed ideas for characters and plots from the series including the school name and aspects of the Mr G character.

In response to the George Floyd protests, Summer Heights High was one of several of Lilley's series that Netflix removed from its streaming service due to the use of blackface and brownface in the portrayal of characters. Writing for The Guardian, Seini F. Taumoepeau called Lilley's Jonah character a "racist construct" who did not accurately represent Tongans. The creators of the 2004 ABC TV documentary series Our Boys stated that Lilley drew inspiration for the Jonah character from their work. The subject of Our Boys recalled being "absolutely embarrassed, full of hate, angry and exploited" by the "racist" Jonah character that was based on him. The series' director, as well as a teacher at Canterbury Boys High School also felt that the character "exploited" the Tongan students who Lilley had met while visiting the school after seeing Our Boys on television in 2004.

Cultural impact 
Responding to suggestions there could be a second series, Lilley stated in June 2008 that he was yet to decide what to do next as he had not considered writing further episodes as "it was always a one-off thing". Lilley has since developed two spin-offs from Summer Heights High: Ja'mie: Private School Girl which premiered in 2013 and focused on the character of Ja'mie King, and Jonah from Tonga which continued the story of Jonah Takalua and premiered in 2014.

References

External links

 
 

2007 Australian television series debuts
2007 Australian television series endings
2000s Australian comedy television series
2000s high school television series
2000s LGBT-related comedy television series
2000s satirical television series
2000s teen sitcoms
2000s Australian television miniseries
Australian Broadcasting Corporation original programming
Australian high school television series
Australian mockumentary television series
Australian satirical television shows
Cross-dressing in television
English-language television shows
HBO original programming
2000s LGBT-related sitcoms
Logie Award for Most Outstanding Comedy Program winners
Narcissism in television
Race-related controversies in television
Television series about teenagers
Television shows set in Victoria (Australia)
Television series about educators